Gerald Joseph Ehman (November 3, 1932 – March 21, 2006) was a Canadian ice hockey player. He played in the National Hockey League (NHL) for the Boston Bruins, Detroit Red Wings, Toronto Maple Leafs and the Oakland Seals/California Golden Seals between 1957 and 1971, and also spent several years in the minor American Hockey League, and other leagues. After retiring, he worked in executive positions for several years.

Playing career
Ehman played 429 regular season games in the NHL, scoring 96 goals and 118 assists for 214 points. He also played for various teams in the American Hockey League, Western Hockey League and the Quebec Hockey League.  He died on March 21, 2006 of lung cancer.

Career statistics

Regular season and playoffs

Awards and achievements
1964  John B. Sollenberger Trophy winner (Rochester).
1964  NHL All Star.
1963-64 Stanley Cup Champion with Toronto (as a Player)
1979-80 Stanley Cup Champion with New York Islanders (Scout)
1980-81 Stanley Cup Champion with New York Islanders (Scout)
1981-82 Stanley Cup Champion with New York Islanders (Head Scout)
1982-83 Stanley Cup Champion with New York Islanders (Assistant General Manager/Director of Scouting)

References

External links

1932 births
2006 deaths
Boston Bruins players
California Golden Seals players
Canadian people of German descent
Canadian ice hockey right wingers
Deaths from lung cancer
Detroit Red Wings players
Edmonton Flyers (WHL) players
Flin Flon Bombers players
Hershey Bears players
Ice hockey people from Saskatchewan
Oakland Seals players
Quebec Aces (QSHL) players
Rochester Americans players
St. Louis Flyers players
Springfield Indians players
Stanley Cup champions
Toronto Maple Leafs players
Vancouver Canucks (WHL) players